Lansden is a surname. Notable people with the surname include:

D. L. Lansden (1869–1924), American judge
Merle Lansden (1907–1989), American attorney, judge, and politician